We Three is an album by keyboardist and composer Stanley Cowell, recorded in Japan with drummer Frederick Waits and bassist Buster Williams in 1987 and released on the Japanese DIW label.

Reception

AllMusic rated the album 3 stars.

Track listing
All compositions by Stanley Cowell except where noted.
 "Deceptacon" (Buster Williams) – 7:05
 "Winter Reflections" – 7:57
 "Enja-J" (Frederick Waits) – 7:16
 "Sienna: Welcome My Darling" – 5:15
 "Sendai Sendoff" – 7:28
 "Air Dancing" (Buster Williams) – 9:33
 "My Little Sharif" (Frederick Waits) – 6:13
 "Christina" (Buster Williams) – 7:52
 "Winter Reflections" [Alternate Take] – 6:46

Personnel
Stanley Cowell – piano
Buster Williams – bass
Frederick Waits – drums

References

1989 albums
Stanley Cowell albums
DIW Records albums